Comilla Government Women's College is a public college in Comilla, Bangladesh established in 1960. The college is located in Comilla including its Intermediate, Honors and Masters section.

Departments
 Bangla
 Botany
 Chemistry
 English
 Economics 
 Islamic History and Culture
 Mathematics
 Philosophy
 Political Science
 Physics
 Social Works
 Zoology

See also
List of Educational Institutions in Comilla

References

External links
 Comilla Govt. Women's College

Colleges in Comilla District
Colleges affiliated to National University, Bangladesh
Universities and colleges in Cumilla District
Women's universities and colleges in Bangladesh
Educational institutions established in 1960
1960 establishments in East Pakistan